The 2006 Massachusetts general election was held on November 7, 2006, throughout Massachusetts.

At the federal level, Ted Kennedy was re-elected to the United States Senate, and all ten seats in the United States House of Representatives were won by incumbent Democratic Party candidates.

Incumbent Republican Governor Mitt Romney did not run for re-election and was succeeded by Democrat Deval Patrick. Martha Coakley was elected Attorney General. Democratic incumbents were re-elected Secretary of the Commonwealth, Auditor, and Treasurer.

In the Massachusetts General Court, Democrats gained one seat in the Senate and two seats in the House.

Governor and Lieutenant Governor

Incumbent Republican governor Mitt Romney chose not to seek re-election for a second term in office.

Primary elections for Governor and Lieutenant Governor were conducted separately with the Democrats nominating former Assistant U.S. Attorney General Deval Patrick and Mayor of Worcester Tim Murray. The Republicans nominated a ticket of incumbent Lieutenant Governor Kerry Healey and former State Representative Reed Hillman.
 
Patrick and Murray were elected Governor and Lieutenant Governor in the general election.

Secretary of the Commonwealth
Incumbent Democratic Secretary William F. Galvin ran for re-election to a fourth term in office. He was opposed in the Democratic primary by John C. Bonifaz, a voting-rights activist who founded the National Voting Rights Institute.

Democratic primary

Polling

Results

General election

In the general election, Galvin's only challenger was Green-Rainbow nominee Jill Stein, a medical doctor and community activist who ran for governor in 2002.

Polling

Results

Attorney General
Incumbent Attorney General Thomas Reilly ran for Governor instead of seeking a third term in office.

Democratic Middlesex County District Attorney Martha Coakley was elected Attorney General, defeating former Norfolk County District Attorney Republican Larry Frisoli, a trial attorney from Belmont who was known for his handling of the Jeffery Curley case against NAMBLA. Both candidates were unopposed for nomination in their parties' primaries.

General election

Polling

Results

Treasurer and Receiver-General
Incumbent Democrat Timothy P. Cahill was re-elected over Green-Rainbow candidate James O'Keefe, who also ran in 2002. Republican Ronald K. Davy, a financial analyst and Hull selectman, was nominated but failed to reach signature requirement to qualify for the ballot.

General election

Polling

Results

Auditor
Incumbent Democrat Joe DeNucci was re-elected for a sixth term over Working Families nominee Rand Wilson, a union organizer and labor communicator. Republican candidate Earle Stroll, a 52-year-old small-business consultant from Bolton, also failed to reach signature requirement to qualify for the ballot. Green-Rainbow candidate Nathanael Fortune, a physicist from Smith College and a Whatley School Committee member, dropped out of the race for personal reasons in late March 2006.

General election

Polling

Results

U.S. House of Representatives
see 2006 United States House of Representatives elections in Massachusetts

Massachusetts Senate
see 2006 Massachusetts Senate election

Massachusetts House of Representatives
see 2006 Massachusetts House of Representatives elections

Governor's Council
See 2006 Massachusetts Governor's Council election

Ballot questions
There were three statewide ballot questions, all initiatives, which the Massachusetts voters voted on this election, and all were defeated. There were also various local ballot questions around the state.

Statewide Questions:
Question 1 - Sale of Wine by Food Stores. A law to allow local authorities to license stores selling groceries to sell wine.
Question 2 - Nomination of Candidates for Public Office. A law to create "more ballot choices" by allowing for fusion voting.
Question 3 - Family Child Care Providers. A law to allow home-based family child care providers providing state-subsidized care to bargain collectively with the state government.

Polling

Results

References

External links
 Elections Division, Massachusetts Secretary of the Commonwealth- Official government site.

Campaign sites
Attorney General
 Martha Coakley (D)
 Larry Frisoli (R)

Secretary of the Commonwealth
 John Bonifaz (D)
 William F. Galvin (D)
 Jill Stein  (GR)

Ballot Questions
Question 1 - Sale of Wine by Food Stores:
LWV Question One Summary - includes link to full text
Yes on 1: Grocery Stores and Consumers for Fair Competition
No on 1:  Wine Merchants and Concerned Citizens for S.A.F.E.T.Y. (Stop Alcohol’s Further Extension to Youth)
Massachusetts Food Association - supporting Question 1,  the selling of wine in grocery stores

Question 2 - Nomination of Candidates for Public Office:
Massachusetts Ballot Freedom Campaign - supporting Question 2, allowing NY-style party fusion

Not on statewide ballot in 2006:
 Massachusetts Common Cause - supporting independent redistricting commission
 Home From Iraq Now - supporting withdrawal of Massachusetts National Guard from Iraq
 MassACT: Affordable Care Today! - supporting the "Affordable Health Care Act"
 Vote on Marriage - supporting constitutional amendment to ban same-sex marriage

General
Massachusetts